The Jølstra is a river in Sunnfjord Municipality in Vestland county, Norway. The river begins at the village of Vassenden, on the shores of the lake, it then goes past the village of Langhaugane, then past the Moskog area of Førde, past the village of Bruland, and it finally flows to its mouth at the town of Førde, on the shores of the fjord. There are four hydroelectric power stations in the river.

Fishing
The lower sections of the Jølstra are rich in salmon and sea trout. Although the salmon species have been protected by law since 1992, the authorities open the river for fishing for a brief period every year. The fishing window usually begins in mid-July of each year and lasts until the end of August. There are also natural barriers to fishing on the Jølstra. The river is a fast flowing one, so fishing is not safe or suitable everywhere. One of the best fishing areas on the river is where the waters from the lake Jølstravatnet flow out into it.

References

Sunnfjord
Rivers of Vestland
Rivers of Norway